Sayre is a borough in Bradford County, Pennsylvania, United States. It is part of Northeastern Pennsylvania. It is the principal city in the Sayre, PA Micropolitan Statistical Area. It is currently the largest city in Bradford County. In the past, various iron products were made there. In 1900, 5,243 people lived there; in 1910, 6,426 people lived there, and in 1940, 7,569 persons made their homes in Sayre. The population was 5,403 at the 2020 census.

Sayre is part of the Penn-York Valley ("The Valley"), a group of four contiguous communities in New York and Pennsylvania: Waverly, New York; South Waverly, Pennsylvania; Sayre; Athens, Pennsylvania, and smaller surrounding communities with a combined population near 35,000.

History 
In May 1870, a Waverly banker named Howard Elmer, along with Charles Anthony and James Fritcher, bought the Pine Plains area between Waverly and Athens.  Elmer convinced Asa Packer to locate a new railroad repair facility on the Pine Plains for the expanding Lehigh Valley Railroad, which was making a push north to connect to the Erie Railroad at Waverly. Robert Heysham Sayre, president of the Pennsylvania and New York Railroad, helped cement the deal. The town was named in his honor. Sayre was incorporated on January 27, 1891.

In 1904 when the locomotive shops were built at Sayre, the main shop building was believed to be the largest structure in the world under one roof, but held that title for only a brief time. The railroad operated from 1870 until 1976, but maintenance facilities were shifted away before that. With the decline of industry, population has declined since 1940.

The Pennsylvania Guide, compiled by the Writers' Program of the Works Progress Administration, described Sayre in 1940 and emphasized the economic and social significance of the railroad, noting that Sayre:

Geography
Sayre is located at  (41.983567, -76.520845) in a river valley in the Allegheny Plateau just north of the confluence of the Susquehanna River and the Chemung River, along with Athens, Pennsylvania, South Waverly, Pennsylvania, and Waverly, New York. Together, these small towns make up the greater area known as the Penn-York Valley, or just "the Valley". The New York / Pennsylvania border cuts through the valley. There is no physical border between the towns, as the grid of streets and avenues blend seamlessly from one town to another. Sayre is bounded on the east and west by Athens Township, on the south by the borough of Athens, on the northwest by South Waverly, and on the north by Waverly, New York.

Pennsylvania Route 199 passes through the borough as Keystone Avenue, Mohawk Street, and Spring Street, ending at Interstate 86 just over the state line in Waverly, New York.

Demographics

2010
At the 2010 census there were 5,587 people, 2,479 households, and 1,394 families living in the borough. The racial makeup of the borough was 96% White, 0.8% African American, 0.3% Native American, 1.7% Asian, 0.2% from other races, and 1% from two or more races. Hispanic or Latino of any race were 1.1%.

There were 2,479 households, 27.3% had children under the age of 18 living with them, 39.9% were married couples living together, 11.7% had a female householder with no husband present, and 43.8% were non-families. 37.3% of households were made up of individuals, and 16% were one person aged 65 or older. The average household size was 2.23 and the average family size was 2.94.

The age distribution was 22.8% under the age of 18, 60.1% from 18 to 64, and 17.1% 65 or older. The median age was 41 years.

The median household income was $34,221 and the median family income  was $57,256. Males had a median income of $41,895 versus $27,816 for females. The per capita income for the borough was $20,956. About 6.6% of families and 11.7% of the population were below the poverty line, including 16.9% of those under age 18 and 5.3% of those age 65 or over.

2000
At the 2000 census there were 5,813 people, 2,529 households, and 1,514 families living in the borough. The racial makeup of the borough was 96.92% White, 0.62% African American, 0.17% Native American, 1.26% Asian, 0.15% from other races, and 0.88% from two or more races. Hispanic or Latino of any race were 0.71%.

There were 2,529 households, 26.9% had children under the age of 18 living with them, 43.9% were married couples living together, 11.9% had a female householder with no husband present, and 40.1% were non-families. 35.6% of households were made up of individuals, and 16.2% were one person aged 65 or older. The average household size was 2.28 and the average family size was 2.96.

The age distribution was 23.9% under the age of 18, 7.8% from 18 to 24, 28.2% from 25 to 44, 21.9% from 45 to 64, and 18.3% 65 or older. The median age was 39 years. For every 100 females there were 85.7 males. For every 100 females age 18 and over, there were 82.0 males.

The median household income was $33,338 and the median family income  was $40,571. Males had a median income of $30,685 versus $24,837 for females. The per capita income for the borough was $18,549. About 7.1% of families and 9.1% of the population were below the poverty line, including 8.7% of those under age 18 and 8.4% of those age 65 or over.

Notable people

 Arcesia (John Anthony Arcesi), jazz singer
 Chuck Ciprich, race car driver
 Colleen Dominguez, ESPN reporter
 Peter Cacchione, communist labor leader who served on the New York City Council
 Donnie Guthrie, physician
 George Hennard, perpetrator of the Luby's shooting
 Cabot Lyford, sculptor born in Sayre in 1925
 Red Murray, baseball player
 Erwin Rudolph, billiards player
 Robert S. Smith, priest
 Jeff Terpko, baseball player

Media

Newspaper
 The Morning Times: formerly called The Evening Times (based in Sayre; serves Waverly, Sayre, Athens and surrounding communities)
 Star-Gazette (based in Elmira; serves Tioga, Chemung and Steuben counties in New York and Bradford County in Pennsylvania)
 The Daily Review (based in Towanda; serves Bradford County and surrounding areas)

Radio
 WEBO - 105.1 FM (W286CS licensed in Waverly; studios in Owego for the Twin Tiers market)
 WAVR - 102.1 FM (studios in Sayre; licensed in Waverly for the Twin Tiers market)
 WATS - 960 AM (studios in Sayre; licensed in Sayre for the Twin Tiers market)
 WENI-FM - 92.7 FM (in Horseheads, New York; licensed in South Waverly (adjacent to Sayre) for the Twin Tiers market)
 W297BG - 107.3 FM (in Wysox; licensed in Ulster, Athens, and Sayre for the Twin Tiers market

Television

Sayre is served by many local television stations, in three broadcast television markets, along with Charter Communications' Spectrum News 1.
 Binghamton: WBNG CBS; WIVT ABC; WBGH NBC; WICZ Fox; and WSKG Public Television
 Elmira: WETM NBC; WENY ABC & CBS; and WYDC Fox
 Wilkes-Barre/Scranton: WOLF (W52CE-TV Sayre) Fox; WNEP ABC; and WYOU CBS

Transportation
Sayre has one bus service, BeST Transit. BeST Transit makes numerous stops in Waverly, Sayre, and Athens and provides service to Towanda, Wysox, Troy, Canton, and the Lycoming Mall. Sayre and The Valley also have taxi service available through Valley Taxi. Pennsylvania Route 199 connects Sayre to Athens and Waverly.

Education
Children residing in the borough are assigned to attend the Sayre Area School District.

Community

Sayre is home to the Guthrie Robert Packer Hospital and Guthrie Clinic.

Community organizations:
Sayre Little League
Sayre Recreation Program
Big Brothers/Big Sisters
4H
Community Service Club
Sayre Library

Horned giants
The "horned giants" of Sayre is an urban legend concerning a series of skeletons that included a horned skull reportedly discovered during the 1880s by the then-state historian, Dr. G.P. Donehoo, and two visiting professors, A.B. Skinner and W.K. Moorehead while excavating a burial mound. The skeletons were reported to be at or above  in height, possessing skulls that had horn-like protuberances just above the eyebrows, but were claimed to have been lost, misplaced, or stolen while en route to the American Investigation Museum. Neither Donehoo, Skinner, nor Moorehead described the discovery of any human skeletons at Sayre exhibiting gigantism or horned protrusions in their official excavation reports

References

External links

 
 Morning Times, local newspaper
 

 
Populated places established in 1871
Boroughs in Bradford County, Pennsylvania
1871 establishments in Pennsylvania